Athens is an unincorporated community in Athens Township, Isanti County, Minnesota, United States.

Main routes include Isanti County Road 9 (269th Avenue NE), Isanti County Road 56 (261st Avenue NE), and State Highway 65 (MN 65).

Nearby places include Isanti, East Bethel, Stacy, and Athens Wildlife Management Area.

The Cedar Creek Ecosystem Reserve, operated by the University of Minnesota, is also nearby.

Infrastructure

Transportation
  Minnesota State Highway 65
  Isanti County Road 9
  Isanti County Road 56

References

 Mn/DOT map of Isanti County – 2013 edition

Unincorporated communities in Minnesota
Unincorporated communities in Isanti County, Minnesota